William Clagett may refer to:

 William Clagett (controversialist) (1646–1688), English clergyman and controversialist
 William B. Clagett (1854–1911), Maryland tidewater tobacco farmer
 William H. Clagett (1838–1901), American politician and lawyer